Vradeto is a village in the Greek Zagori region (Epirus region). It lies at a height of 1340m on Mt Tymphe in the Pindus mountain range. It is the highest of the 44 villages of Zagori.  It is the middle of the  Vikos–Aoös National Park and is about 50 km away from Ioannina. It is located only a few kilometers from the Vikos Gorge and near one of the best vantage points, Beloe (Beloi)  (perhaps a Slavic word meaning "good view" or "balcony"). It is located also close to an alpine lake called Drakolimni (Dragon’s Lake), one of several such lakes. The lakes are named after the amphibian newts (Ichthyosaura alpestris) that live in them, around which there are myths of dragons. The myths are echoes of ancient myths about the hero Pindus, son of Macedon, who either befriended or according to another myth killed a dragon.

Nearest places

Tsepelovo, east (distance: 10 km)
Kapesovo, south (distance: 5 km)

Population

History
Until the close of the 20th century there was only one way to reach the village, via a kalderimi (paved mule road) called the Skala of Vradeto a stairway of about 1000 steps built on the side of a canyon and almost impossible to seem from a distance. It starts at the end of a long path from the village of Kapesovo. Vradeto’s difficulty of access probably explains its location in the inhospitable highlands near the top of Mt Tymphe.  A road was opened in the 1970s.  It is believed to have been settled initially by families from Skamneli at around 1616, according to Ioannis Lamprides.

Orthodox Albanians, locally called "Arvanites", have the village settled after the 15th century and were later assimilated into the local population. Sarakatsani have settled at the beginning of the 20th century.

The traditional stone architecture is dominant in every building, in the village paths, dwellings and churches, many now ruined or in a state of significant disrepair. The main church, dedicated to the Birth of Mary was built in 1799 with a donation from Nikolaos Tsigaras. Other churches are those of Agios Athanasios at the top of the Skala, Agios Nikolaos, Prophetes Elias and Agios Georgios with a cemetery.

Folklore
The Feast of the Birth of Mary is celebrated with a three-day festival starting on 8 September.

Bibliography

References

External links
  Cultural Club of Vradeto

Populated places in Ioannina (regional unit)
Villages in Greece